Partamona is a genus of Meliponini (Stingless bees) in appended hymenoptera of the Apidae family. Herbert Ferlando Schwarz in 1938 described the genus. The genus is found in Sonora, Chihuahua, San Luis Potosí, in Mexico, Mato Grosso in Brazil, and eastern Peru.

Species
 Partamona aequatoriana Camargo, 1980 
 Partamona ailyae Camargo, 1980 
 Partamona auripennis Pedro & Camargo, 2003 
 Partamona batesi Pedro & Camargo, 2003 
 Partamona bilineata Say, 1837
 Partamona brevipilosa Schwarz, 1948
 Partamona chapadicola Pedro & Camargo, 2003 
 Partamona combinata Pedro & Camargo, 2003 
 Partamona criptica Pedro & Camargo, 2003 
 Partamona cupira Smith, 1863
 Partamona epiphytophila Pedro & Camargo, 2003 
 Partamona ferreirai Pedro & Camargo, 2003 
 Partamona grandipennis Schwarz, 1951
 Partamona gregaria Pedro & Camargo, 2003 
 Partamona helleri Friese, 1900
 Partamona littoralis Pedro & Camargo, 2003 
 Partamona mourei Camargo, 1980 
 Partamona mulata Moure, 1980 
 Partamona musarum Cockerell, 1917
 Partamona nhambiquara Pedro & Camargo, 2003 
 Partamona nigrior Cockerell, 1925
 Partamona orizabaensis Strand, 1919
 Partamona pearsoni Schwarz, 1938
 Partamona peckolti Friese, 1901
 Partamona rustica Pedro & Camargo, 2003 
 Partamona seridoensis Pedro & Camargo, 2003 
 Partamona sooretamae Pedro & Camargo, 2003 
 Partamona subtilis Pedro & Camargo, 2003 
 Partamona testacea Klug, 1807
 Partamona vicina Camargo, 1980 
 Partamona vitae Pedro & Camargo, 2003 
 Partamona xanthogastra Pedro & Camargo, 1997 
 Partamona yungarum Pedro & Camargo, 2003 
 Partamona zonata Smith, 1854

References

Hymenoptera genera
Meliponini
Bee genera
Apinae